England Dan & John Ford Coley is the first album by the pop rock duo of the same name.

Track listing
All songs written by John Ford Coley and Dan Seals.

"Mud and Stone" - 2:46
"Miss Me" - 3:06
"Swamp River" - 2:20
"Tell Her Hello" - 3:15
"Lady Rose" - 2:49
"New Jersey" - 3:00
"Winning Side" - 3:15
"Elysian Fields" - 2:50
"I'm Home" - 2:10
"Ask the Rain" - 1:58

Personnel
 Performers – England Dan Seals and John Ford Coley 
 Arrangements – Artie Butler, Jimmie Haskell, and Louie Shelton

Production
 Producer – Louie Shelton
 Engineer – Henry Lewy
 Art Direction – Roland Young 
 Design – Chuck Beeson
 Photography – Frank Laffittle
 Liner Notes – Bob Garcia

References

1971 debut albums
England Dan & John Ford Coley albums
albums arranged by Jimmie Haskell
A&M Records albums